Benedetti–Wehrli Stadium is a stadium in Naperville, Illinois. It is primarily used for American football, soccer and track and field and has a seating capacity of 5,500.

History
Benedetti–Wehrli Stadium is named after two North Central College alumni: Albert Benedetti and Richard Wehrli. The stadium opened in 1999 for North Central College and was used by the Chicago Fire in 2002 and 2003, when it was known as Cardinal Stadium. 

Benedetti–Wehrli hosts two highly hyped high school football games featuring Naperville Central High School versus Naperville North High School and Waubonsie Valley  High School versus Neuqua Valley High School. The stadium also serves as host to a competitive drum corps show hosted by The Cavaliers Drum and Bugle Corps of Rosemont, Ill., each summer. 

The stadium hosted the 2000 NCAA Division III Men's Outdoor Track and Field Championship. The stadium also served as a venue for the quarter finals of the 2000 Lamar Hunt U.S. Open Cup. In 2018, the stadium became the home field for the Chicago Wildfire of the American Ultimate Disc League.

References

American football venues in Illinois
Athletics (track and field) venues in Illinois
Chicago Fire FC
College football venues
College track and field venues in the United States
Former Major League Soccer stadiums
North Central Cardinals football
Soccer venues in Illinois
Ultimate (sport) venues
Sports venues completed in 1999
1999 establishments in Illinois